Sisterhood may refer to:

 Relating to sisters, female siblings

Film
 The Sisterhood (1988 film), an American film directed by Cirio H. Santiago
 The Sisterhood (2004 film), an American film directed by David DeCoteau
 Sisterhood (2008 film), a British-New Zealand film directed by Richard Wellings-Thomas
 Sisterhood (2016 film), a Macanese-Hong Kong film directed by Tracy Choi
 Sisterhood (2021 film), a Macedonian drama film

Music
 The Sisterhood (gothic rock band), a short-lived English band
 The Sisterhood Band (country music duo)

Publications
 Sister-hood, an online magazine edited by Deeyah Khan
 Sisterhood Magazine, a teen Christian magazine 2009–2014

Television
 The Sisterhood (TV series), a reality TV show about preachers' wives
 "Sisterhood" (Once Upon a Time), an episode
 "Sisterhood" (Robin Hood), an episode

Other uses
 Sisterhood (feminism), solidarity between women in the context of sexual discrimination
 Sorority, a social organization for undergraduate students

See also
 Sisters (disambiguation)
 Brotherhood (disambiguation)